The 2022 North Indian Ocean cyclone season was an event in the annual cycle of tropical cyclone formation. It was an above-average season in terms of depressions and average in terms of deep depressions, but slightly below-average in terms of cyclonic storms. It was also the least deadly North Indian Ocean cyclone season since 1988, according to official data. The North Indian Ocean cyclone season has no official bounds, but cyclones tend to form between April and December, with the peak from May to November. These dates conventionally delimit the period of each year when most tropical cyclones form in the northern Indian Ocean.

The scope of this article is limited to the Indian Ocean in the Northern Hemisphere, east of the Horn of Africa and west of the Malay Peninsula. There are two main seas in the North Indian Ocean — the Arabian Sea to the west of the Indian subcontinent, abbreviated ARB by the India Meteorological Department (IMD); and the Bay of Bengal to the east, abbreviated BOB by the IMD.

The official Regional Specialized Meteorological Centre in this basin is the India Meteorological Department (IMD), while the Joint Typhoon Warning Center (JTWC) releases unofficial advisories. On average, three to four cyclonic storms form in this basin every season.


Season summary

The season began with BOB 01 which formed on March 3 over the Bay of Bengal. It peaked as a deep depression, before weakening as a well-marked low-pressure area on March 6. The system became the eighth system to form in March since reliable records began in 1891. On March 20, another deep depression classified as BOB 02 formed in the Andaman Sea. BOB 02 made landfall in Myanmar before dissipating. After more than 1 month of inactivity, a low-pressure system formed off the coast of Andaman and Nicobar Islands on May 6. On the next day, JTWC classified it as Tropical Cyclone 02B, followed by IMD which recognized it as Depression BOB 03. The depression intensified into a cyclonic storm, named Asani, making it the first named storm in the season. Soon, Asani was upgraded to Category 1 cyclone by JTWC, and IMD upgraded to a severe cyclonic storm. Afterward, Asani began to weaken rapidly due to high wind shear. and made landfall in Andhra Pradesh as a deep depression. Later in May, BOB 04 quickly consolidated into a depression as it landed on the south Burmese coast. Activity ceased for approximately 2 months before Depression ARB 01 was designated and struggled against strong wind shear and dry air intrusions. In August, four systems were designated by the IMD. Land Depression 01 was short-lived and degenerated to a remnant low over Chhattisgarh. Depression ARB 02 formed a couple of days later and even though the IMD kept the system as a depression, the JTWC upgraded ARB 02 to Tropical Cyclone 03A. Having a tropical storm-force cyclone form in the Arabian Sea in August is rare, and the last system to become one was Cyclone Aurora (1983). Depression BOB 05 followed and the brown ocean effect aided the system to maintain depression status for a few more days. After BOB 05, Deep Depression BOB 06 was designated by the IMD after the JTWC unofficially upgraded it to Tropical Cyclone 04B due to attaining tropical storm-force winds. BOB 06 later made landfall in Digha, West Bengal and caused 32 deaths. In September, the IMD briefly designated Land Depression 02. In late October, the IMD monitored an area of low pressure, which was designated as BOB 07 and later became Cyclonic Storm Sitrang, officially the second named storm of the season. The cyclonic storm abruptly headed north-northeast and early on October 24, it made landfall in Patuakhali, Bangladesh. Sitrang is the first tropical cyclone to hit Bangladesh since Cyclone Mora in 2017, and caused 35 fatalities. After Sitrang, Depression BOB 08 formed and struggled to consolidate a well-defined center before causing minor impacts to parts of southern India. In December, Deep Depression BOB 09 formed. IMD later upgraded it to Cyclonic Storm Mandous. Despite moderate easterly mid-level wind shear, Mandous intensified to a Severe Cyclonic Storm as it neared Sri Lanka. It made landfall near Chennai, India, as a Deep Depression and caused 9 deaths. The remnants of Mandous transferred across southern India and into the Arabian Sea. The system quickly developed and was designated as Depression ARB 03 by IMD. The storm unexpectedly rapidly developed and the JTWC designated it as Tropical Cyclone 07A, peaking with winds of 60 mph (95 km/h). After ARB 03, Depression BOB 10 formed and meandered in the Bay of Bengal before dissipating.

Systems

Deep Depression BOB 01

Towards the end of February, a cyclonic circulation had formed over the Strait of Malacca and the adjoining Andaman Sea, which later intensified into a low pressure area on midday (17:30 IST) of February 28, as the disturbance formed a low-level circulation, according to a INSAT-3D satellite imagery. Early the next day, at 09:00 UTC (14:30 IST), the disturbance further intensified into a well-marked low pressure area, as it developed a defined cyclonic vortex, and three-and-a-half-hour later, the United States-based Joint Typhoon Warning Center (JTWC) started monitoring the same disturbance as Invest 90B. On March 3 of midnight (05:30 IST), the well-marked low organized to a depression and the India Meteorological Department (IMD) identified the system as BOB 01, making it the first system of the season. This intensification was possible because of a favourable Madden–Julian oscillation (MJO) phase, along with a feeble easterlies outflow. Sea surface temperature (SST) was also warm enough for cyclogenesis to take place, along with moderate to high vertical wind shear. During the next day, the JTWC issued a Tropical Cyclone Formation Alert (TCFA) on the system. The depression subsequently intensified into a deep depression, and by 21:00 UTC (02:30 IST), the JTWC started initiating advisories for Tropical Cyclone 01B. After maintaining its intensity for a day, the JTWC issued its last warning for the system, at 15:00 UTC (20:30 IST) as the increasing dry air had weakened its convective mass. The IMD subsequently weakened back to a depression due to the same reason. On March 6, the IMD issued its last advisory for the system and downgraded it to a well-marked low pressure area, as its convective mass got further disorganized by the wind shear.

Deep Depression BOB 02

In mid-March, a low-pressure area formed in the southwest Bay of Bengal, offshore of Sri Lanka, which later intensified into a well marked low pressure area, and the JTWC started monitoring the disturbance as Invest 91B. It meandered east-southeast for three days, and on March 20, the IMD reported that a depression formed over the Bay of Bengal, giving it the designation BOB 02. On that day, the JTWC issued a TCFA for the system. The system gradually intensified, into a deep depression by 00:00 UTC (05:30 IST) the next day, as the convection had further organized favorable conditions such as moderate to high sea-surface temperatures. On March 22, the JTWC cancelled the TCFA due to the land interaction in Myanmar until the landfall. BOB 02 rapidly weakened overland, degenerating into a depression and by 03:00 UTC (08:30 IST) the next day the system weakened into a well-marked low pressure area and IMD issued last advisory.

Severe Cyclonic Storm Asani

During the first week of May, a strong pulse of Madden-Julian Oscillation (MJO) and Equatorial Rossby wave (ERW) prevailed in this basin. These two conditions led to a cyclonic circulation forming over the southern Andaman Sea on May 4. At the same time, a Westerly wind burst occurred on the same day which resulted in formation of twin cyclones over the either side of the Indian Ocean. The southern hemisphere counterpart being Tropical Cyclone Karim and the northern hemisphere counterpart being this cyclonic circulation. The JTWC followed suit and designated it as Invest 92B on the next day. On May 6, under the influence of the same disturbance, a low pressure system formed off the coast of Andaman and Nicobar Islands. Subsequently, the JTWC issued its TCFA, as it had rapidly consolidated its convective structure for the past few hours, along with development of a well-defined low-level center. By the morning of May 7, the system became more well-marked over the same region. At 09:00 UTC (14:30 IST), the JTWC initiated advisories on the system and classified it as Tropical Cyclone 02B, while IMD followed the suit and upgraded it to Depression BOB 03. Three hours later, the system was further upgraded to a deep depression status by the IMD, after forming a defined central dense overcast cloud pattern. By 05:30 IST (00:00 UTC) of the next day, the system organized into Cyclonic Storm Asani, becoming the first cyclone of the season. The name Asani was provided by Sri Lanka, which means wrath in Sinhala language. Nine hours later, the JTWC upgraded it to a Category 1 status. At 12:00 UTC (17:30 IST), the IMD further upgraded it to a severe cyclonic storm, as microwave imagery showed a well-organized system. On May 10, the cyclone began to encounter high wind shear due to which the JTWC downgraded it as a tropical storm while the IMD continue to maintain it as a severe cyclonic storm.  it began to make a sudden westward jog and mild decrease in wind shear made the JTWC to upgrade it again into a Category 1-equivalent tropical cyclone. Nine hours later, Asani was further downgraded into a tropical storm, it began to weaken rapidly due to higher wind shear as well as dry air intrusion. On May 11, 12:00 UTC, Asani further weakened to a Deep Depression as it made landfall in the Indian State of Andhra Pradesh.
The next day, the IMD issued its last advisory as the system degenerated into a low pressure area.

Depression BOB 04 

A fresh cyclonic circulation developed on early May 19, over the Gulf of Martaban, due to the enhancement of the annual South-West monsoon over the basin. By the evening, under the influence of that circulation, a low pressure system spawned over the same region. At 18:00 UTC (23:30 IST), the JTWC also acknowledged that same circulation at the night of the same day. By 00:30 UTC (06:00 IST) the JTWC published its TCFA for the system after it had rapidly consolidated its convective structure for the past few hours, and also formed a well-defined low-level center. But eight hours later, the JTWC, cancelled it because its close proximity over land.  However, according to IMD, it rapidly consolidated into a well-marked low pressure area in the morning of the same day, and further into a depression at 11:30 IST (03:00 UTC), as it moved northeastwards, towards the south Burmese coast. Between 08:00 UTC (13:30 IST) and 09:00 UTC (14:30 IST), the system made landfall over the southern Burmese coast,  from Mawlamyine. Despite making landfall, the system maintained its depression status as it moved further into land, due to the embedded southwesterly monsoon to sustain the system and possibly a result of the brown ocean effect as well. At 00:00 UTC (05:30 IST), the system started to lose steam and finally weakened into a well-marked low pressure area over the Burmese-Thailand border due to the system's interaction with the rough terrain.

The system helped the monsoon to further advance into parts of southern Arabian Sea, southern parts of Maldives and parts of southern and east-central Bay of Bengal.

Depression ARB 01 

On July 15, the JTWC started monitoring a disturbance west of Jafrabad, Gujarat, and it was unofficially designated as Invest 96A. The disturbance substantially deepened, early on the next day, which prompted JTWC to upgrade it chance of formation to medium. At 03:00 UTC of the same day, the IMD noted the disturbance and upgraded it to a tropical depression, becoming the first tropical depression of the season in the Arabian Sea. It peaked as a depression, with maximum sustained wind speed 
However, the system started to lose steam on the next day, as it moved away from the Indian coastline, due to dry air intrusion and increasing wind shear. By 18:00 UTC, the JTWC ceased tracking Invest 96A, and on July 18, the IMD issued its last warning, citing its weakening to a remnant low.

Land Depression 01 

A monsoonal low spawned over the northwestern region of Bay of Bengal, off the West Bengal and Odisha coast on midday of August 6, which later concentrated into a well-marked low pressure area on the next day. By August 9, it concentrated into a depression, after moving over coastal Odisha due to the incoming monsoonal trade winds. It managed to maintain its intensity overland, until at 00:00 UTC (05:30 IST) of August 10, it was downgraded to a remnant low over Chhattisgarh and adjoining east Madhya Pradesh.

Depression ARB 02 

After the dissipation of Land Depression 01, a sudden surge of equatorial Rossby Waves and Kelvin Waves prevailed over the basin. These two waves helped in a formation of another monsoonal low over Saurashtra and adjoining northeastern Arabian Sea on August 10, which later concentrated into a well-marked low pressure on August 11. The JTWC, on the same day, designated it as Invest 98A. By August 12, favorable conditions like high sea-surface temperature (SST), moderate wind shear and a strong pulse of MJO, helped for further concentration into a depression, but its center was sheared due to wind shear. The JTWC soon followed the suit and upgraded it to Tropical Cyclone 03A. However, as it moved westwards away from the Indian coastline, the wind shear increased significally, which decayed its convective structure. At 03:00 UTC (08:30 IST), the JTWC ceased issuing advisories to the system. Nine hours later, the IMD followed the same, and downgraded to a remnant low.

Depression BOB 05 

Under an influence of another cyclonic circulation, a low pressure area formed over north Bay of Bengal on August 13. Substantially, it concentrated into a well-marked low pressure area on the same day. After reaching near the coast of northern Odisha and West Bengal, it further concentrated into a depression at 03:00UTC (08:30IST) of August 14. The depression made landfall near Digha, West Bengal, two hours after its designation. Brown ocean effect played a major role in the system's lifetime, as it managed to maintain its depression status over land for three days. Along with brown ocean effect, low vertical wind shear and moisture feeding monsoonal trade winds also helped to retain its intensity. At 12:00UTC (17:30IST) of August 17, the depression finally weakened into a well-marked low pressure over southwestern Rajasthan. The system caused widespread heavy rainfall across Odisha, West Bengal, Jharkhand, Central India and Rajasthan.

Deep Depression BOB 06 

On August 17, the JTWC recognized a newly formed low level circulation near Myanmar and designated it Invest 99B, which showed disorganized convective structure and an obscure low-level center. By the next day, it developed into a low pressure area over northeastern Bay of Bengal and adjoining Bangladesh coast. The JTWC unofficially released a TCFA for the system after its rapid development of its convective structure. By the same day, at 21:00UTC (02:30IST), the JTWC unofficially declared it Tropical Cyclone 04B. The IMD followed the same, and upgraded it to Depression BOB 06. At 06:00UTC (11:30IST), BOB 06, further concentrated into a deep depression, just off the coast of West Bengal and Bangladesh. Shortly after intensifying, it made landfall close to Digha, West Bengal between 13:30UTC and 14:30UTC (19:00IST and 20:00IST) of the same day. At 21:00UTC (02:30IST), the JTWC issued its last advisory after making a landfall. Like the previous system, it also didn't dissipate even after making landfall and instead, managed to maintain its intensity. Although, it weakened into a depression on August 21, over northeastern Madhya Pradesh and southeastern Uttar Pradesh, it continued to stay afloat for another two days, until on August 23, it weakened into a well-marked low pressure area over eastern Rajasthan and adjoining northwestern Madhya Pradesh. There were thirty-two cyclone-related deaths as BOB 06 passed through Losses of flooding in Odisha in related to BOB 06 was Rs1.26 billion (US$15.9 million), and its remnants later contributed to 2022 Pakistan floods.

Land Depression 02

Cyclonic Storm Sitrang 

Sitrang originated from an area of ​​low pressure near the Bay of Bengal offshore the Andaman and Nicobar Islands on October 17, although it was designated as having a "low" chance for development at first. Later, during its existence, the Indian Meteorological Department designated a "high" possibility of the system becoming a depression. Days later, warm waters and less wind shear contributed to favorable conditions for development, and the IMD classified the low pressure area as a depression, being called BOB 07, according to the third bulletin. The Joint Typhoon Warning Center issued a Tropical Cyclone Formation Alert (TCFA) on the system by 15:00 UTC of October 22. Hours later, BOB 07 gained momentum and in the agency's fifth bulletin, it was reported that it had intensified into a deep depression. On October 23, the cyclone gained more strength and reached the status of a cyclonic storm, being called Sitrang by the India Meteorological Department. By 09:00 UTC of October 23, the JTWC designated the storm as Tropical Storm 05B. As it was predicted to make landfall over Bangladesh, there was a prediction that Sitrang would turn into a severe cyclonic storm, but dry air hindered its intensification. Upon making landfall near Patuakhali, Bangladesh, in the early hours of October 24, the cyclone began to lose strength and was downgraded to a deep depression. The JTWC issued final warning on the system by 21:00 UTC of October 24. Afterwards, Sitrang continued to weaken, and in its thirteenth and final bulletin, the IMD declared that the cyclone was downgraded to a low pressure area by 06:00 UTC of October 25. It dissipated over Northeast India that evening.

Sitrang was the first cyclone to hit Bangladesh since Cyclone Mora in 2017. During its passage, at least 24 people died and another 8 are missing. In Bangladesh, 700,000 people were evacuated from their homes because of heavy rains. Damage was also recorded in eastern India. At least 8 million customers lost power. About 20 fishermen were rescued in the Bay of Bengal by the Indian Coast Guard.

Depression BOB 08 

On November 20, Depression BOB 08 formed in the Bay of Bengal, however struggled to consolidate a well-defined center. It made landfall after degenerating into a remnant low-pressure area. It caused minor impacts to Andhra Pradesh, Tamil Nadu, and Karnataka.

Severe Cyclonic Storm Mandous 

The Indian Meteorological Department issued a bulletin stating that a tropical depression had formed in the Bay of Bengal and was designated BOB 09. The JTWC, released a TCFA on the system, stating that it could intensify further, because of very warm waters and low to moderate wind shear, designating it Invest 96B. A day later, both the JTWC and IMD classified this low pressure as a "cyclonic storm" and it was named Mandous. As it continued tracking westward, land interaction caused in to fall to Cyclonic Storm intensity. It later made landfall around Chennai, India as a Deep Depression. It fell to Depression intensity, and later degenerated into a remnant low.

Mandous caused nine deaths in total; four in Tamil Nadu and five in Sri Lanka.

Deep Depression ARB 03 

On December 14, the remnants of Cyclone Mandous regenerated into a depression in the Arabian Sea, and it was called ARB 03. The Joint Typhoon Warning Center dubbed it as Invest 97A. Although forecasted to quickly degenerate into a remnant low, ARB 03 intensified into a Deep Depression, according to the Indian Meteorological Department, and the JTWC dubbed it as Cyclone 07A. After reaching peak intensity, the Low-Level Circulation detached from the associated convection as dry air and wind shear increased, starting a weakening trend. It weakened into a low pressure area on 12:00 UTC of December 17.

Depression BOB 10 

On December 22, the JTWC began tracking a disturbance near Sumatra. It traveled westward before conducting an anticyclonic loop. It traveled north, then west, then north again. By this time, the IMD had already recognized it as a Depression, designating it as BOB 10, while the JTWC designated it as Invest 98B. The JTWC and the IMD assessed BOB 10 and gave it a low chance to develop into a tropical cyclone due to a broad LLC (Low Level Circulation) partially exposed to the southeast of flaring convection that is being sheared to the northwest, and marginally favorable environment. On December 25, the system weakened further as it approaches the coast of India being a remnant low. The JTWC was still tracking the system, and it made landfall in Northeastern Sri Lanka. The JTWC still gave it a low chance for tropical development, while the IMD said it couldn't develop further. The storm continued to weaken and dissipated southwest of Sri Lanka on December 27.

BOB 10 gave minor impacts to Sri Lanka.

Storm names
The names were selected by a new list from the Regional Specialized Meteorological Center in New Delhi by mid-year of 2020. There is no retirement of tropical cyclone names in this basin as the list of names is only scheduled to be used once before a new list of names is drawn up. Should a named tropical cyclone move into the basin from the Western Pacific, it will retain its original name. The next three available names from the List of North Indian Ocean storm names are below.

Season effects
This is a table of all storms in the 2022 North Indian Ocean cyclone season. It mentions all of the season's storms and their names, duration, peak intensities according to the IMD storm scale, damage, and death totals. Damage and death totals include the damage and deaths caused when that storm was a precursor wave or extratropical low. All of the damage figures are in 2022 USD.

|-
| BOB 01 ||  || bgcolor=#| || bgcolor=#| || bgcolor=#| || Sri Lanka ||  None ||  || 
|-
| BOB 02 ||  || bgcolor=#| || bgcolor=#| || bgcolor=#| || Andaman and Nicobar Islands, Myanmar ||  None ||  || 
|-
| Asani ||  || bgcolor=#| || bgcolor=#| || bgcolor=#|  || Andaman and Nicobar Islands, Andhra Pradesh, Tamil Nadu, Karnataka, Odisha || > ||  || 
|-
| BOB 04 ||  || bgcolor=#| || bgcolor=#| || bgcolor=#|  || Myanmar, Thailand ||  None ||  || 
|-
| ARB 01||  || bgcolor=#| || bgcolor=#| || bgcolor=#|  || Gujarat||  None ||  || 
|-
| LAND 01 ||  || bgcolor=#| || bgcolor=#| || bgcolor=#| || Central India, Odisha ||  None ||  || 
|-
| ARB 02 ||  || bgcolor=#| || bgcolor=#| || bgcolor=#| || Gujarat, Oman ||  None ||  || 
|-
| BOB 05 ||  || bgcolor=#| || bgcolor=#| || bgcolor=#| || Central India, Rajasthan, Odisha, West Bengal ||  None ||  || 
|-
| BOB 06 ||  || bgcolor=#| || bgcolor=#| || bgcolor=#| || Bangladesh, Jharkhand, Odisha, Rajasthan, West Bengal, Central India, Uttar Pradesh||  ||  || 
|-
| LAND 02 ||  || bgcolor=#| || bgcolor=#| || bgcolor=#| || Chhattisgarh, Odisha, West Bengal ||  None ||  || 
|-
| Sitrang ||  || bgcolor=#| || bgcolor=#| || bgcolor=#|  || Andaman and Nicobar Islands, West Bengal, Odisha, Jharkhand, Meghalaya, Assam, Tripura, Bangladesh || > ||  || 
|-
| BOB 08 ||  || bgcolor=#| || bgcolor=#| || bgcolor=#| || Andhra Pradesh, Tamil Nadu, Karnataka ||  None ||  || 
|-
| Mandous ||  || bgcolor=#| || bgcolor=#| || bgcolor=#| || Andaman and Nicobar Islands, Sri Lanka, Tamil Nadu || > ||  || 
|-
| ARB 03 ||  || bgcolor=#| || bgcolor=#| || bgcolor=#| || None ||  None ||  || 
|-
| BOB 10 ||  || bgcolor=#| || bgcolor=#| || bgcolor=#| || Sri Lanka ||  None ||  ||

See also

 Weather of 2022
 Tropical cyclones in 2022
 North Indian Ocean cyclone season
 2022 Atlantic hurricane season
 2022 Pacific hurricane season
 2022 Pacific typhoon season
 South-West Indian Ocean cyclone seasons: 2021–22, 2022–23
 Australian region cyclone seasons: 2021–22, 2022–23
 South Pacific cyclone seasons: 2021–22, 2022–23

References

External links

RSMC New Delhi
Indian Meteorological Department
Joint Typhoon Warning Center (JTWC)
National Meteorological Center of CMA 

 
2022 meteorology
2022 NIO
North Indian Ocean cyclone seasons